Jean Kittson  (born 1955) is an Australian performer, writer and comedian in theatre and print, on radio and television.  She made her comedy debut at Melbourne's comedy venue Le Joke in a series of solo performances, and then in the stage version of Let The Blood Run Free.

She came to national attention on The Big Gig. This was followed by Let the Blood Run Free, Kittson Fahey, the Great Debate series as well as Good News Week, The Glasshouse and The Einstein Factor. She is also well known for her lively comedy debates for the ABC, Channel 9 and Channel Ten and was a regular guest on Channel 7's the Morning Show, Channel 9's KAK Show and 20 to One. She has also been a judge on Strictly Speaking and a guest on Talkin' 'Bout Your Generation.

Kittson is a regular guest on TGIF, ABC radio 702, Sydney and has been a regular columnist with New Weekly, Sunday Telegraph, the SMH Sydney Magazine, Inspire Magazine, and the Reader's Digest Health Smart magazine.

She is the author of Tongue Lashing, published by Penguin. She also authored a book on menopause, You're Still Hot To Me in 2014.

She was appointed a Member of the Order of Australia in the 2023 Australia Day Honours.

Television 
Kittson is best known for her performances, particularly as a news commentator Veronica Glenhuntly, on the ABC1 evening comedy program The Big Gig, which aired in the early 1990s.  Kittson also starred in the TV series of Let The Blood Run Free, which was first shown on Network Ten in 1990, and ran for two seasons.  Kittson was a regular guest on ABC1's The Einstein Factor and The Glasshouse.

In 2022, Kittson appeared as  a contestant on the sixth season of The Celebrity Apprentice Australia.

Theatre highlights 
Her first major role was in David Wiliamson's play, Siren in 1990. Her theatre work also includes: A Midsummer Night's Dream; The Night of The Missing Bridegroom; and Behind The Mask. Kittson also performed Love Letters with Glynn Nicholas for the Melbourne Arts Festival and revisited the role in 2003 at the Noosa Arts and Cultural Festival with the late Campbell McComas.

Kitson played a schoolteacher in Delta Blues in 2005.

Charity work
Jean Kittson is an avid supporter of multiple charities and is currently the Chair of the National Gynaecological Cancer Foundation.

In February 2010, Kittson became the official spokesperson for the Ovarian cancer awareness month for Ovarian Cancer Australia, and in 2011 became the official national Afternoon Teal ambassador.

Jean is Patron of The Junction Works - Community Services  and an Ambassador for:
 The Macular Disease Foundation Australia
 Northcott Disability Services
 The Raise Foundation – Youth Mentoring
 Taldumande Member Foundation (Taldumande Youth Services) - Homeless youth and families in crisis.
Palliative Care Nurses Australia

Cinema
In 2010, Kittson appeared in Bad Behaviour, starring Lindsay Farris, John Jarratt and Roger Ward, written and directed by Joseph Sims.

Personal life
She is married to the cartoonist Patrick Cook; they have two daughters.

Filmography

References

External links
 

1955 births
Living people
Members of the Order of Australia
Comedians from Melbourne
Australian film actresses
Australian television actresses
Actresses from Melbourne
The Apprentice Australia candidates
People from Lilydale, Victoria